3rd Madras Native Infantry could refer to:

1st Battalion which became the 63rd Palamcottah Light Infantry 
2nd Battalion which became the 73rd Carnatic Infantry